Piromyces is a genus of fungi in the family Neocallimastigaceae.

Piromyces sp. E2 physiology and genome 
Piromyces sp. E2 is an eukaryotic species belonging to the phylum Chytridiomycota, which comprises organisms that possess flagellated zoospores, making them unique among the fungi.

These obligate anaerobic chytrid fungi lack mitochondria, possessing instead hydrogenosomes (hydrogen- and ATP-producing organelles), representing a unique order (the Neocallismasticales) within the chytrids.

These anaerobic symbionts play a key role in the herbivore digestive tract by providing hydrogen for the bacterial species living in the herbivore gut, but also by aiding with the digestion of plant cell wall material, converting cellulose to glucose and other simple sugars, making them available for the host and for other symbiotic species.

References

External links

Neocallimastigomycota
Fungus genera